Arrhenia epichysium is a species of agaric fungus in the family Hygrophoraceae. It is found in Asia, Europe, and North America. The cap color changes to light gray to tan when it is dry. Gills are narrow and thin, placed together closely, and decurrently attached to the stipe. The spores are smooth and ellipsoid, measuring 6–7.5 μm.

References

External links

Fungi described in 1794
Fungi of Asia
Fungi of Europe
Fungi of North America
Hygrophoraceae
Taxa named by Christiaan Hendrik Persoon